Mississippi Highway 541 (MS 541) runs north–south from U.S. Highway 84 (US 84), at a point about  south of the Simpson–Jefferson Davis county line to MS 13 near Puckett. Just east of Puckett, it merges with MS 18 for a short distance. It travels directly through Magee, entering on Pinola Drive (also marked as MS 28), making a left on to Main Avenue South, a one-block jog (on 1st Street Southeast) just after Simpson Highway 149, then continuing out of town on 1st Avenue Northeast.

History
Between 1946 and 1948, a gravel road was constructed from US 49 and MS 20 in Magee to MS 18 near Puckett. By 1950, a small section of the road near Magee was paved. Around a year later, MS 541 was extended southwards along a gravel road to U.S. Route 84 near Prentiss. The paving project was finished by 1958, and the route was extended northwards to MS 13 northeast of Puckett. A majority of MS 541 in Jefferson Davis County became county maintained by 1960, and all of the route from US 49 to MS 18 was paved. By 1962, more than half of the county-maintained section was paved. The section from MS 28 to MS 13 in Smith County was paved by 1968. The county-maintained section in Jefferson Davis County was removed from the state highway system by 1996.

Major intersections

See also

 List of state highways in Mississippi

References

External links

541